Arthur Henderson Hall (Sedgefield, County Durham, 1906 - London, 1983); ARCA (1930), RE (1961), RWS (1970), Prix de Rome in Engraving (1931), MSIA; was an English painter in oil and water-colour, draughtsman, etcher and illustrator, and glass designer.

He was educated at Sedgefield, Accrington and Coventry Schools of Art, The Royal College of Art and The British School, Rome. He was also Instructor of Drawing at London Central School of Art, in 1947–1952; Head of School of Graphic Design at the Kingston School of Art, in 1965-1971 (Senior Lecturer in charge 1952–1965). He was illustrator of children's books and books on gardening.

Education and honors
Alumnus of the Royal College of Art (1930)
Prix de Rome in engraving (1931)
Royal Watercolour Society (1970)

External links
Collection of the late Queen Elizabeth the Queen Mother, see the Royal Collection website
The Brill Collection at Kingston Museum, Kingston upon Thames
The Witt Library at the Courtauld Institute of Art, London

English engravers
English etchers
20th-century English painters
English male painters
People from Sedgefield
English illustrators
1906 births
1983 deaths
English watercolourists
Academics of the Central School of Art and Design
Prix de Rome (Britain) winners
20th-century British printmakers
20th-century English male artists
20th-century engravers